Aivar Surva (born 27 March 1962) is an Estonian politician. He was a member of XIII Riigikogu. 

Surva was born in Kohtla-Järve. His brother is conductor Hirvo Surva. He is a 1986 graduate of Tallinn University of Technology, with a degree in automated control systems. He served as the Mayor of Rapla from 2002 until 2005, Mayor of Mäetaguse from  2005 until 2013, and Mayor of Jõhvi Parish from 2014 until 2016.

References

Living people
1962 births
Estonian Reform Party politicians
Members of the Riigikogu, 2015–2019
Mayors of places in Estonia
Tallinn University of Technology alumni
People from Kohtla-Järve]